Callum Beaumont is Scottish bagpipe player.

Life
He was born in Bo'ness in central Scotland, and started playing the practise chanter at the age of seven.

Career
At the age of 12 he joined the now defunct Lothian & Borders Police Pipe Band, and then played with Shotts & Dykehead, Simon Fraser University, Inveraray & District and ScottishPower. He won the World Pipe Band Championships twice with Simon Fraser University and once with Shotts & Dykehead.

As a solo piper he has won the gold medal at the Argyllshire Gathering in 2011 and the Northern Meeting in 2013, and was the youngest ever winner of Clasp at the Northern Meeting in 2012. He has also won the Metro Cup in 2014 and 2016.

He teaches at Dollar Academy, which has a successful youth pipe band.

References

Great Highland bagpipe players
Living people
Gold Medal winners (bagpipes)
Scottish bagpipe players
1988 births